Storozhevaya is a rural locality (a village) in Permasskoye Rural Settlement, Nikolsky District, Vologda Oblast, Russia. The population was 3 as of 2002.

Geography 
Storozhevaya is located 29 km southeast of Nikolsk (the district's administrative centre) by road. Lipovo is the nearest rural locality.

References 

Rural localities in Nikolsky District, Vologda Oblast